The Queen's Award for Enterprise: Innovation (Technology) (2009) was awarded on 21 April 2009, by Queen Elizabeth II.

Recipients
The following business units were awarded this year.

 Aerelink Limited of Merseyside for design and delivery of bespoke wireless solutions and provision of high calibre engineering services.
 AESSEAL (MCK) Ltd of Lisburn, County Antrim for flow fuse - utilised with mechanical seals used, on pump equipment.
 Alcomet Limited of Kingswinford, for guardian security products.
 Alford Technologies Limited of Chippenham, Wiltshire for user-filled high explosive charges which project high velocity water for the neutralization of improvised bombs.
 Alumet Systems (UK) Ltd of Southam, Warwickshire for ABLE Façade for system building protection from bomb blasts
 Apical Limited of London for W1 ‘iridix’ digital core which models how the human eye adapts to changing viewing conditions.
 Astech Projects Limited of Runcorn, Cheshire for automated pharmaceutical testing of metered dose and dry powder inhalers.
 Autonomy Corporation of Cambridge for Intelligent Data Operating Layer (IDOL).
 Beamer Limited of Salisbury, Wiltshire for design and development of a high mobility all-terrain disability buggy.
 Blizzard Protection Systems Limited of Bangor, Gwynedd, Wales for REFLEXCELL - lightweight thermal protection for casualties.
 BullionVault London W6 Gold bullion dealing and storage for private investors.
 CGC Technology Ltd of Farnham, Surrey for design, manufacture, installation and commissioning of satellite tracking systems.
 Cartesian Limited of WC2, London for  ‘Ascertain’ software for telecommunications operators.
 Centek Limited of Newton Abbot, Devon for bow spring, non-welded casing centralisers for the oil industry.
 Oliver Crispin Robotics Ltd (t/a OC Robotics) of Filton, Bristol for development of snake-arm robots for confined space applications
 Crux Products Limited of Godstone, for grout seal.
 Disposable Cubicle Curtains Ltd of Horsham for ‘Easy-fit’ patented disposable cubicle curtains
 EnviroVent Limited of Harrogate, for EnviroVent ‘filterless’ energy-saving extractor fan.
 Excalibur Screwbolts Ltd of Hockley, Essex for the one piece Excalibur Screwbolt high performance fixing anchor for all substrates.
 Flare Solutions Limited of Marlow, Buckinghamshire for E & P catalog web based software product and consulting.
 Forge Europa Limited of Ulverston, Cumbria Custom design of for lED displays, assemblies and lighting solutions.
 Golf-Tech Limited of Swindon, Wiltshire for "Power Tee" automatic golf tee for driving ranges.
 GreenMech Ltd of Alcester, for tracked tool carrier designed to access difficult terrain.
 Greenstar WES Limited of Redcar, Cleveland for innovation in recycling food-grade and other plastics.
 IHC Engineering Business Ltd of Riding Mill, Northumberland for design and manufacture of systems for offshore oil and gas, telecom, renewables and defence.
 Johnson Matthey Emission Control of Royston, for compact soot filters for diesel cars.
 Kingspan Tarec Industrial Insulation Limited of Glossop, Derbyshire for continuous production process for the manufacture of phenolic pipe insulation.
 Knorr-Bremse Rail Systems (UK) Limited of Melksham, Wiltshire for eP2002 modular, mechatronic rail brake control valve.
 McLaren Electronic Systems Ltd of Woking, Surrey for the Standard Electronic Control Unit for FIA Formula for one racing cars.
 Pace Plc of Saltaire, for high definition set-top box technology.
 PhysE Limited of Yarmouth, Isle of Wight for derivation of meteorological and oceanographic design criteria for offshore installations.
 Plextek Ltd of Great Chesterford, for electronic product design, supply and consultancy.
 Possum Limited of Aylesbury, for disability home control unit with touch screen.
 Powertraveller Ltd of Alton, Hampshire for portable power solutions for electronic devices.
 RF Engines Ltd of Newport, Isle of Wight for electronic product and systems design using complex digital signal processing techniques.
 Renishaw plc of Wotton-under-Edge, Gloucestershire for oMP400 ultra-compact strain gauge spindle probe with RenGage  3D technology
 ScriptSwitch Limited of Coventry for prescribing decision support for the medical profession, increasing clinical standards and reducing costs.
 Sirus Automotive Ltd of Wednesbury, West Midlands for product development and production methods of vehicles for wheelchair users.
 Smartstak of Sheffield for a load handling system which eliminates breakages when transporting glass bottles.
 Sondrel Ltd of Reading, Berkshire for implementation of complex integrated circuits.
 TRL Technology Limited of Tewkesbury, Gloucestershire for BROADSHIELD Counter for radio-controlled Improvised Explosive Device solutions for military, civilian and VVIP protection.
 Thermo Fisher Scientific (Cambridge UK) of Cambridge for the iCAP 6000 Series Inductively Coupled Plasma Optical Emission Spectrometer (ICP-OES).
 Tracerco of Billingham for a range of radiation and contamination monitors.
 Valor Fires of Erdington for Homeflame high efficiency inset gas fire range.
 Vascutek Limited of Inchinnan, Renfrewshire for bioValsalva - porcine aortic valved conduit.
 West Energy Saving Technologies Ltd of Bramcote, Nottingham  VENTMISER CMSM (carbon management for switch module) automatic ventilation controllers.
 Wireless CCTV Ltd of Rochdale, Lancashire Wireless for CCTV dome cameras for mobile surveillance.
 Women Like Us of London N19 for supporting women with children to return to work and employers to source experienced part-time staff.

References

Queen's Award for Enterprise: Innovation (Technology)
2009 in the United Kingdom